Apatema sutteri is a moth of the family Autostichidae. It is found in North Macedonia, Greece and on Crete.

References

Moths described in 1997
Apatema
Moths of Europe